The following is a list of the 77 municipalities (comuni) of the Province of Sondrio, Lombardy, Italy.

List

See also 
List of municipalities of Italy

References 

Sondrio